Cruiser Dreams is a 1980 science fiction novel by American writer  Janet Morris, the second in her Kerrion Space trilogy.

Plot summary 
The Kerrions, rulers of the most far-reaching empire in the known universe, attempt to reclaim control of their empire while their renegade second son, Chaeron, retrieves Shebat, his wife, from Earth. As a qualified cruiser pilot, Shebat returns to claim her sentient cruiser and her place in the Kerrion dynasty against danger and numerous obstacles. The characters of Shebat and Chaeron, and their relationship, mature and become more complex as they adapt to each other and the circumstances they face in this second book in the series. Shebat becomes a staunch defender of the right of the space cruisers to develop their own intelligence, which threatens the control of the Kerrion Empire. The theory of “sponge” travel is explored more deeply. The story concludes in the third book, Earth Dreams.

References

1981 American novels
1981 science fiction novels
Novels by Janet Morris
Berkley Books books